Devil's Lake is a lake in the South Range of the Baraboo Range, about two miles south of Baraboo, Wisconsin, in Sauk County, Wisconsin, United States.  It has no surface outlets, so by some definitions, it is endorheic; however, it possibly drains by underground channels into the Baraboo River, which would make the lake cryptorheic. The lake is one of the primary attractions of Devil's Lake State Park. It is also a popular recreation destination for watercraft, fishing, hiking, and climbing.

Name
Devil's Lake was so named because it is situated in a deep chasm with no visible inlet or outlet.  The term, Devil's Lake is a misinterpretation of the Ho-Chunk names Te Wakacakra or De Wakacak (Tawacunchukdah or Da-wa-kah-char-gra), which better translates to "Sacred Lake" or "Spirit Lake." Spirit Lake is highly significant in Ho-Chunk oral history, and voices of spirits were often heard during the celebrations.

History

The original inhabitants of the area around the lake date back much further than when the European settlers first discovered the land. There is proof that humans occupied the land between 12,000 to 16,000 years ago, but Ho-Chunk historians speak of people living there longer than 300,000 years ago. The area may have been inhabited originally between 12,000 to 16,000 years ago due to the fact that this was the time the last of the glaciers had receded from the area. Many Native tribes throughout Wisconsin inhabited the lands. They called the lake various different names, such as Tewakakak or Minnewaukan, which translate to spirit lake in various Native American Languages.

Devil's Lake was originally a gorge of the Wisconsin River prior to the last ice age.  At what is now the southern end of the lake, the river turned from a southerly direction to an easterly direction.  During the ice age, a lobe of the glacier passed to the east of the Baraboo Hills and came up the river valley.  It deposited materials and then melted, leaving a terminal moraine blocking the river, forming an earthen dam.  Another moraine was deposited at the north end of the lake.  The river eventually found a new course to the east of the Baraboo Hills, where the glacier had been, leaving a portion of the river gorge between the moraines filled with water.  This body of water is Devil's Lake.

Geology 
The Devil's Lake State Park is made up of bluffs that are believed to be one of the most ancient surface rock area in North America. Formed about 1.6 billion years ago, the land consists of Northern and Southern mountain ranges that are made up of quartzite rock. Quartzite was formed after ancient rivers deposited sediment from when this land was under water. Over time, that sediment accumulated into sandstone and underwent immense heat and pressure to form the non-porous metamorphic rock that now encompasses the Baraboo valley. The valley itself consists of softer rock as continental plate activity caused the quartzite rock to form into what's known now as the North and South range.

Water Temperature 
The water temperatures of Devils Lake varies significantly throughout a calendar year. The highest water temperatures are reported between July and August between 75 and 80 degrees Fahrenheit. The lowest water temperatures for the year are in January, with an average temperature of 35 degrees Fahrenheit. The lake freezes over in the winter, but ice thickness is unmeasured.

Devils Lake Activities

Hiking 
Devils Lake State Park offers 29 miles of hiking trails that vary based on difficulty level, length, and terrain. Among the 17 established trails, the most popular is the tumbled rocks trail. It sits at the edge of the lake on the west end, stretching a mile long. The trail is paved, allowing it to be accessible for people with disabilities or visitors that wish to use a wheelchair, as well as ranked as "easy". Many visitors report to using this trail in order to find a spot to fish from or a rock jump off of. The parks most popular diving rock, Rock 8, can be accessed via the Tumbled Rocks trail. A second trail to highlight is the East Bluff Trail, with multiple overlooks and views, rock formations, and an abundance of wildlife. Rock formations pop up regularly throughout the trail, yet there are special appearances of the. "Elephant Rock" and "Elephant Cave" along the way, two famous landmarks of the park. The trail continues for 1.7 miles, gaining over 500 feet of elevation and is expected to take hikers anywhere between 1.5 to 3 hours to complete.

Wildlife and Birdwatching 
There are an estimated 115 species of birds that nest in Devils Lake State park, including many unique species. The Canada Goose, Mallard, Blue Winged Teal, Turkey Vulture, American Goldfinch, and House-sparrow are some of the most popularly spotted birds. The Great Blue Heron is particularly unique to Devils Lake. There are large birds, stretching up to 4′ 5″ feet tall and sports a wingspan that can reach 6 ½ feet. Blue Herons gather in "rookeries", meaning a colony of nests. They travel and live as a group, known for being very loud birds.

The park also remains home to 38 mammals, with the White-tailed Deer, Raccoon, Red fox, Coyote, American beaver, Gray squirrel, Fox squirrel, Red squirrel, Southern flying squirrel, Eastern chipmunk, and Little brown bat listed as the most likely to see. Black Bears, Mountain  Lions, and River Otters are rare to spot, yet can also be found in the Park.

Timber Rattlesnakes nest along the trails of Devils lake. Although there is great fear around these animals, they has only been two verified deaths in Wisconsin due to a rattlesnake bite since 1900. Their population is on the decline, leading them to make the Protected Wild Animal list of Wisconsin. Water snakes are sighted frequently in the park area as well.

Winter Activities 
Although the trails are not maintained during the winter, they remain open, supporting numerous activities.

Cross country skiing is popular at Devils Lake State Park. There is one loop trail used for skiing that continues along Steinke Basin Loop. The trail is not tracked and conditions are not guaranteed to be great, yet visitors report that the overall experience is worth it.

The "multi use" Steinke Basin Loop trail is also quite frequently used for snowshoeing. Devils Lake State Park allows visitors to roam free without restriction.

References

See also
Devil's Lake State Park Official Website
Ice Age Trail

Lakes of Sauk County, Wisconsin
Endorheic lakes of the United States
Religious places of the indigenous peoples of North America
Tourist attractions in Sauk County, Wisconsin